John Douglas, often spelled Douglass in early Maryland records, was born in Scotland c. 1636, probably at his father's estate of Blythswood near Glasgow. He emigrated to Maryland in c. 1654, during the English Civil War.  His father, Sir Robert Douglas of Blackerstoun and Blythswood, was a prominent Catholic Royalist and a descendant of the Douglas of Mains family, a cadet branch of the Black Douglases.  Through his mother, Douglas was a grandson of Robert Douglas, Viscount Belhaven, a prominent member of King James I/VI Court in London.

Douglas had named his first land holding in Maryland 'Blythswood'.  He was a military major at the time, but ended his life as a colonel in the Maryland Militia. In addition to holding the Lord of the Manor title from Cold Springs Manor, Douglas owned a number of other properties, most located in Charles County, Maryland.  He also served as a justice and a Burgess before his death in 1678 or 1679.  He married Sarah Bonner, widow Bowles, and they had a large family.

1636 births
1670s deaths